South Florida Folk Festival is an annual music and arts festival in Fort Lauderdale, Florida, United States sponsored by the Broward Folk Club.

External links
 South Florida Folk Festival

Folk festivals in the United States